Helga Ruebsamen (4 September 1934 – 8 November 2016) was a Dutch writer. She received the Ferdinand Bordewijk Prijs in 1998 for Het lied en de waarheid.

Works
De kameleon (1964)
De heksenvriend (1966) 
Wonderolie (1970) 
De ondergang van Makarov (1971) 
Op Scheveningen (1988) 
Pasdame (1988) 
Olijfje en andere verhalen (1989) 
De dansende kater (1992) 
Alleen met Internet (1996, with Rogi Wieg) 
Het lied en de waarheid (1997) 
Beer is terug (1999) 
De bevrijding (1999) 
Jonge liefde en oud zeer : de verhalen (wolume 1, 2001)
Jonge liefde en oud zeer : de verhalen (volume 2, 2001)
Zoet en zondig : de mooiste verhalen uit Indonesië (2003)

References

Profile at the Digital library for Dutch literature

1934 births
2016 deaths
20th-century Dutch novelists
21st-century Dutch novelists
20th-century Dutch women writers
People from Batavia, Dutch East Indies
Ferdinand Bordewijk Prize winners
21st-century Dutch women writers
Dutch women novelists